Larry Joe Inman (born January 3, 1948) is an American college basketball coach. The Tennessee State Lady Tigers are members of the Ohio Valley Conference (OVC) and compete in the NCAA's Division I. In 1991, while at Eastern Kentucky, Inman became the first coach to earn the OVC Coach of the Year award at two different schools, having previously been so honored at Middle Tennessee.

Biography
A native of Gallatin, Tennessee, Inman received his bachelor's degree from Austin Peay State University in 1970 and his master's degree from Tennessee State in 1978. He and his wife, the former Bobbie Gene Follis of Shelbyville, Tennessee, have a son, two daughters, and five grandchildren.

Coaching career
Iman began his coaching career in 1970 in his hometown, at Gallatin Junior High School, where his teams were 51–4 in his three seasons. The next five years were spent as coach of the girls team at Mount Juliet High School in Mount Juliet, Tennessee where his teams went 126–24, won three conference titles, four district and three regional championships, and the 1977 Tennessee Class AAA state tournament.

Inman was then hired as the women's coach at Middle Tennessee State University in Murfreesboro. His Blue Raiders teams won six regular season conference titles and four OVC tournaments in his eight seasons at MTSU. His teams played in the NCAA tournament four consecutive years, 1983–86, and Inman was named OVC Coach of the Year three times.

After two years away from coaching, in 1988, Inman was named head coach of the Lady Colonels at Eastern Kentucky University in Richmond, Kentucky, a school that had had a winning season only once in eleven OVC seasons. In his third season, the Lady Colonels posted their first winning season in six years, and Inman became the first coach to be named the OVC Coach of the Year at two different institutions. During his twenty-year tenure at EKU, Inman's teams won the OVC regular season five times and the conference tournament twice, advancing to the NCAA tournament twice and the Women's NIT once, and he was named OVC Coach of the Year five times.

Inman retired in 2008 but returned to coaching at Lebanon High School in Lebanon, Tennessee in 2010.

The all-time winningest coach in Ohio Valley Conference women's basketball history, Inman was elected to the OVC Hall of Fame in 2009. On April 16, 2012, Tennessee State University in Nashville, announced that, following a national search, Inman was to be their new head women's basketball coach.

After upsetting SIUE and UT Martin to win the 2015 OVC  Women's Basketball Tournament, Inman took his third OVC team to the NCAA Tournament.

On March 9, 2017, Inman resigned from Tennessee State for personal reasons.

Head coaching record
Sources:

References

1948 births
Living people
American women's basketball coaches
Basketball coaches from Tennessee
Eastern Kentucky Colonels women's basketball coaches
High school basketball coaches in the United States
Middle Tennessee Blue Raiders women's basketball coaches
People from Gallatin, Tennessee
Tennessee State Lady Tigers basketball coaches